The Atmore  Historic Commercial District is a  historic district in Atmore, Escambia County, Alabama. It includes parts or all of Carney, Main, Trammell, Roberts, Presley, E. Church & Ridgeley Sts., Pensacola, Nashville & Louisville Aves.

In 2019 the state of Alabama recognized an Ardmore Commercial Historic District, and the district was nominated to the National Register of Historic Places.

The district then included 72 contributing buildings and 25 non-contributing ones. "According to the city’s application written by McNair Historic Preservation Inc., the city, divided by an active east to west railroad track, holds many historic buildings of the 20th century, and many are still being used today for commercial purposes. According to the latest survey in 2002, the whole city can boast approximately 580 structures that are 50 years old or more."

It was added to the National Register of Historic Places in 2021.

References

National Register of Historic Places in Escambia County, Alabama
Historic districts in Escambia County, Alabama
Historic districts on the National Register of Historic Places in Alabama